The Escape from Fort Stanton occurred on November 1, 1942, when four German sailors escaped from an internment camp at Fort Stanton, New Mexico. There were other minor escape attempts from the fort, however, the incident in November 1942 was the most successful and the only one to end with a shootout. One German was wounded as result and the three remaining prisoners were sent back to Fort Stanton.

Background
Fort Stanton, located about seven miles northeast of Capitan, was an old United States Army post from the Wild West days, but when World War II began, a camp was built at the site for German and Japanese internees. Most of the German prisoners, including the four involved in the escape, were crew members of the SS Columbus, a luxury liner that was sunk by her own crew 400 miles off the coast of Virginia, United States, on December 19, 1939. The camp at Fort Stanton was originally built specifically for the crew of Columbus, which amounted to over 400 men, and was also the first American internment camp for civilians opened during the war. The guards were members of the United States Border Patrol, rather than the army. Fort Stanton was chosen because there were abandoned buildings from the Civilian Conservation Corps adjacent to the fort, which could be utilized, and there was also a hospital nearby. Furthermore, "the location ensured that any pro-Nazi activities would be isolated in this rather lonely part of New Mexico."

The first of the internees to arrive at Fort Stanton came in January 1941. At that time, the post was still under construction, so the Germans were tasked with building accommodations for the newcomers. The Germans built four barracks, a kitchen, a mess hall, a laundry room, lavatories and washrooms, shops, an officer's quarters, and a medical dispensary. There were also gardens for fresh produce, a recreation hall, and a swimming pool in which "mini-Olympic" competitions were held with the local population.

At first, the camp resembled more of a small town than a prison. The Germans were allowed a lot of freedom because the United States and Germany were not yet at war, but after Adolf Hitler's declaration on December 9, 1941, permission to go to Capitan, or hike in the nearby mountains, was no longer obtainable. For two years the German sailors had waited to go home, and now that the war had begun they were no longer being held as "distressed seamen", but rather enemy aliens that could only be released when the war was over. It was at this time that the guard towers and barbed wire fences were built.

The escape
There were a few escape attempts before and after the incident in November 1942; the Germans "climbed fences, walked off work details, or dug tunnels", but all of the escapees were caught and returned to the camp. After a while, the Germans likely felt that escaping was futile because of the remoteness of the area. Apart from Mexico, which is over 100 miles south of the Fort Stanton, there was nowhere to escape to. Even still, four men attempted to make the journey.

On the night of November 1, 1942, Bruno Dathe, Willy Michel, Hermann Runne, and Johannes Grantz, managed to sneak out of the camp, using the darkness as cover, and make their way south towards the border.  Their absence from the camp was soon discovered though, so a large manhunt conducted by the police in New Mexico, Texas, and Mexico, began. The Germans did not get very far: On November 3, a rancher and member of a posse named Bob Boyce spotted the escapees while he was guarding Gabaldon Canyon. Boyce immediately sent word to the main body of the posse, which was under the command of Deputy Joe Nelson and consisted of about twenty-five men. After a little trailing, the posse found the Germans about fourteen miles south of the camp, on a hill inside the Lincoln National Forest. According to contemporary newspapers, the Germans were either bathing in a stream or sleeping on the grassy hill when the possemen rode up to them on horseback. It was thought that one of the escapees was armed with an automatic pistol but one of the escapees confirmed later in life that none of them were armed, as they had no access to any guns and had just run away. There was a brief shootout, resulting in the wounding of one of the Germans, but all were detained and quickly taken back to Fort Stanton.

Newspaper accounts
The following was reported in the November 3, 1942 edition of the Tucson Daily Citizen:

The following appeared in the November 4, 1942, edition of the Montreal Gazette:

See also

 Arizona during World War II
 List of prisoner-of-war escapes
 Military history of the United States during World War II

References 

Military history of the United States during World War II
History of New Mexico
1942 in New Mexico
Conflicts in 1942
POW escapes and rescues during World War II
Escapes in the United States